is a vertically scrolling shooter arcade video game released by Nichibutsu in 1985. The player controls a flying craft to destroy the Mandler army before they destroy all of humanity. Gameplay involves shooting enemies and collecting different ship parts that each provide their own unique weapon, such as a wave gun or a double shot. It is the sequel to the 1980 fixed shooter Moon Cresta, Nichibutsu's first big hit in arcades.

Gameplay

The player controls the "Wing Galibur" fighter craft and must shoot down the incoming enemy craft in the air and on the ground. 

The game uses a unique powerup system: small capsules appear on the ground. Once the player has shot all of them down, the game awards the player with a piece that attaches onto the Wing Galibur. Four different pieces are available to give the Wing Galibur extra firepower and wider shots. They also act as shields, giving the player extra hits before they die. Should the player add all pieces to the ship and press the "transform" button, the Wing Galibur will transform into an invulnerable flaming phoenix for a brief period of time. Additionally, the player can press the transform button without all pieces to cause the pieces to split from the Wing Galibur and move into a triangular shape around the player. While separated, the pieces are invulnerable to all enemy fire, while the main ship is not. If the player is hit while separated, the Wing Galibur will revert to a singular craft.

Ports
Terra Cresta was ported to several home systems. European publisher Ocean Software published conversions for the Amstrad CPC, ZX Spectrum and Commodore 64 on their Imagine Software label, while Nichibutsu themselves published a version for the Family Computer in Japan. The Famicom release was later published in North America for the Nintendo Entertainment System by Vic Tokai; it features a few alterations from the Japanese version, such as a remade soundtrack and the ability to customize the position of the player's ships when they separate from formation. In 1992, Japanese developer Dempa ported both Terra Cresta and its predecessor Moon Cresta to the Sharp X68000 as the debut title in their Video Game Anthology line of arcade game re-releases, titled Video Game Anthology Vol. 1 - Moon Cresta / Terra Cresta.

Reception

In Japan, Game Machine listed Terra Cresta on their October 15, 1985 issue as being the third most-successful table arcade unit of the month.

In a 2016 retrospective review, Hardcore Gaming 101 compared the game to Super Mario Bros. in terms of taking concepts established in its predecessor and expanding on it while adding its own unique ideas alongside. They greatly praised Terra Cresta for its unique power-up system in particular, namely the ability to split the different ships apart for a short while, and favorably compared the gameplay itself to Xevious for its design and challenge, alongside its several nods to Japanese science-fiction shows and mecha. Hardcore Gaming 101 also praised the Nintendo Entertainment System version's soundtrack for being an improvement over the Japanese Family Computer score. In their coverage of the series in 2016, Retro Gamer magazine liked the game's enhancements over titles like Xevious, alongside its "then-contemporary" power-up system.

Legacy
Terra Cresta was released for the PlayStation 2 by Hamster Corporation in 2005 as part of their Oretachi Gēsen Zoku series, including, among other things, a mini soundtrack CD and a replica instruction card. Hamster later released Terra Cresta digitally for the PlayStation 4 in 2014 and the Nintendo Switch in 2018, both being published under the Arcade Archives series. The Famicom version was digitally re-released for Microsoft Windows in 2014 by D4 Enterprise, released for their Project EGG service. After acquiring the entirety of Nichibutsu's video game library in 2013, the rights to Terra Cresta are now owned by Hamster. In 2022, the original arcade version will be included as part of the Sega Astro City Mini V, a vertically-oriented variant of the Sega Astro City mini console.

Notes

References

External links
Terra Cresta at Arcade Archives Page

1985 video games
Nihon Bussan games
Arcade video games
Multiplayer and single-player video games
Nintendo Entertainment System games
Commodore 64 games
ZX Spectrum games
X68000 games
PlayStation 4 games
PlayStation Network games
Vertically scrolling shooters
Video games developed in Japan
Video game sequels
Hamster Corporation games